Phacellus is a genus of longhorn beetles of the subfamily Lamiinae, containing the following species:

 Phacellus boryi (Gory, 1832)
 Phacellus castaneus Monné, 1979
 Phacellus cuvieri Buquet, 1851
 Phacellus dejeani Buquet, 1838
 Phacellus fulguratus Monné, 1979
 Phacellus latreillei Buquet, 1838
 Phacellus plurimaculatus Galileo & Martins, 2001

References

Phacellini